The Nantucket Beacon was an American weekly newspaper that was published on Nantucket Island from 1989 until 1998.

History
The Beacons first edition (Issue I, Volume 1) was dated 9 March 1989.  Its founder, initial editor and publisher were the same person, Ann C. Olson.

The Beacon quickly became a strong competitor to the Island's previous newspaper, The Inquirer and Mirror, so after a few years the Mirrors owners, Ottaway Newspaper Co. bought the Beacon. They ran it until it became unprofitable, and ceased publication in August 1998.

Notable issues
The 1 April 1992 issue ran April Fool's Day jokes on the first and last two pages. The front page stated that an earthquake destroyed Sankaty Head Light. Doctored photographs of the lighthouse were also on the front page.

References

Newspapers published in Massachusetts
Defunct newspapers published in Massachusetts